Gary John Dorrien (born March 21, 1952) is an American social ethicist and theologian. He is the Reinhold Niebuhr Professor of Social Ethics at Union Theological Seminary in the City of New York and Professor of Religion at Columbia University, both in New York City, and the author of 18 books on ethics, social theory, philosophy, theology, politics, and intellectual history.

Prior to joining the faculty at Union and Columbia in 2005, Dorrien taught at Kalamazoo College in Michigan, where he served as Parfet Distinguished Professor and as Dean of Stetson Chapel.

An Episcopal priest, he has taught as the Paul E. Raither Distinguished Scholar at Trinity College in Hartford, Connecticut and as Horace De Y. Lentz Visiting Professor at Harvard Divinity School in Cambridge, Massachusetts.

Dorrien is a member of the Democratic Socialists of America's Religion and Socialism Commission.

Early life 
Dorrien grew up in a working class, semi-rural area of middle-Michigan, Bay County, and in nearby Midland, Michigan. His parents, Jack and Virginia Dorrien, grew up in poor areas of Michigan's Upper Peninsula. Growing up, his family was nominally Catholic. Dorrien played multiple varsity sports at Midland High School and Alma College, graduating summa cum laude from Alma in 1974. He earned graduate degrees from Union Theological Seminary, Princeton Theological Seminary, and a Doctor of Philosophy (PhD) from Union Graduate School in 1989.

Awards 
Dorrien won the American Library Association's Choice Award in 2009 for his book Social Ethics in the Making: Interpreting an American Tradition, which The Christian Century described as "magnificent, sprawling and monumental."

He won the Association of American Publishers' PROSE Award in 2012 for his book Kantian Reason and Hegelian Spirit: The Idealistic Logic of Modern Theology, described as "a brilliant and much needed account of the influence of Immanuel Kant and the tradition of post-Kantian idealism on modern theology."

He won the Grawemeyer Award in 2017 for his book The New Abolition: W. E. B. Du Bois and the Black Social Gospel, described by theologian William Stacey Johnson as, "a magisterial treatment of a neglected stream of American religious history presented by one of this generation's premiere interpreters of modern religious thought performing at the top of his game."

He won the Choice Award in 2018 for his book Breaking White Supremacy: Martin Luther King Jr. and the Black Social Gospel, which Choice described as "intellectual history at its finest...A triumph of careful scholarship, rigorous argument, clear prose, unblinking judgments and groundbreaking conclusions…indispensable."

Books
Logic and Consciousness: The Dialectics of Mind, Hastings Press, 1985.
The Democratic Socialist Vision, Rowman & Littlefield, 1986.
Reconstructing the Common Good: Theology and the Social Order. Orbis Books (June 1990). 
The Neoconservative Mind: Politics, Culture, and the War of Ideology, Temple University Press, 1993, 1994.
Soul in Society: The Making and Renewal of Social Christianity, Fortress Press, 1995.
The Word as True Myth: Interpreting Modern Theology, Westminster John Knox Press, 1997.
The Remaking of Evangelical Theology, Westminster John Knox Press, 1998.
The Barthian Revolt in Modern Theology: Theology Without Weapons, Westminster John Knox Press, 2000.
The Making of American Liberal Theology: Imagining Progressive Religion, 1805 - 1900 (v. 1). Westminster John Knox Press; 1 edition (October 1, 2001). 
The Making of American Liberal Theology: Idealism, Realism, and Modernity, 1900-1950 (v. 2). Westminster John Knox Press; 1 edition (February 2003). 
Imperial Designs: Neoconservatism and the New Pax Americana. Routledge (August 31, 2004). 
The Making of American Liberal Theology: Crisis, Irony, and Postmodernity: 1950-2005 (v. 3). Westminster John Knox Press (November 1, 2006). 
Social Ethics in the Making: Interpreting an American Tradition. Wiley-Blackwell; illustrated edition (December 22, 2008). 
Economy, Difference, Empire: Social Ethics for Social Justice. Columbia University Press; (October 2010). .
Kantian Reason and the Hegelian Spirit: The Idealistic Logic of Modern Theology. Wiley-Blackwell (April 17, 2012). 
The Obama Question: A Progressive Perspective. Rowman & Littlefield Publishers, Inc, 2012. 
The New Abolition: W. E. B. Du Bois and the Black Social Gospel. Yale University Press, 2015. 
Breaking White Supremacy: Martin Luther King Jr. and the Black Social Gospel. Yale University Press, 2017. 
Social Democracy in the Making: Political and Religious Roots of European Socialism.  Yale University Press, 2019. 
In a Post-Hegelian Spirit: Philosophical Theology as Idealistic Discontent. Baylor University Press, 2020.

References

External links
Gary Dorrien. Faculty, Union Theological Seminary in the City of New York
Faith and Economic Justice. Gary Dorrien, Cornel West and Serene Jones appear as guests on Bill Moyers Journal. This program originally aired July 3, 2009 on PBS
 "Theologian and Social Ethicist Gary Dorrien," by Thorne Dreyer, The Rag Blog, May 2, 2012. Includes podcast of April 27, 2012, Rag Radio interview with Gary Dorrien. (57:18)
 Faculty profile discusses Dorrien's family life

1952 births
20th-century American Episcopalians
20th-century American Episcopal priests
20th-century Anglican theologians
21st-century American Episcopal priests
21st-century Anglican theologians
American Christian socialists
American ethicists
American Episcopal theologians
Anglican socialists
Christian socialist theologians
Columbia University faculty
Kalamazoo College faculty
Living people
Members of the Democratic Socialists of America
Union Theological Seminary (New York City) faculty